Inter-crater plains on Mercury are a land-form consisting of plains between craters on Mercury.

Of the eight planets in the Solar System, Mercury is the smallest and closest to the Sun. The surface of this planet is similar to the Moon in that it shows characteristics of heavy cratering and plains formed through volcanic eruptions on the surface. These features indicate that Mercury has been geologically inactive for billions of years. Knowledge of Mercury's geology was initially quite limited because observations have only been through the Mariner 10 flyby in 1975 and observations from Earth. The MESSENGER (an acronym of MErcury Surface, Space ENvironment, GEochemistry, and Ranging) mission of 2004 was a robotic NASA spacecraft orbiting the planet, the first spacecraft ever to do so. The data provided by MESSENGER has revealed a geologically complex planet.

Types of plains 

There are two geologically distinct types of plains on Mercury - smooth plains of volcanic origin, and, inter-crater plains, of uncertain origin.

Smooth plains 
Smooth plains are widespread flat areas resembling the lunar maria of the Moon, which fill depressions of various sizes. A prime example of a smooth plain is the one in which fills a wide ring surrounding the Caloris Basin, the largest impact basin on Mercury. However, a noticeable difference between the lunar maria of the Moon and the smooth plains of Mercury is that these smooth plains have the same albedo, or properties, as the bordering inter-crater plains. Even with a lack of volcanic features, it is still believed that smooth plains are of volcanic origin.

Inter-crater plains 
Inter-crater plains are the oldest visible surface on Mercury, predating the heavily cratered terrain. They are gently rolling or hilly plains and occur in the regions between larger craters. The inter-crater plains appear to have covered up or destroyed many earlier craters, and show a general scarcity of smaller craters below about 30 km in diameter. It is not clear whether they are of volcanic or impact origin. The inter-crater plains are distributed roughly uniformly over the entire surface of the planet.

The most heavily cratered regions on Mercury contain large areas essentially free of impact craters with diameters greater than 50 kilometers. The surface areas of these regions can basically be divided into two categories: clusters of large craters and plains bordering these clusters of craters. This combination of surface features has been called "inter-crater plains" by the Mariner 10 Imaging Science Team. These plains have sparked debate.

Origin hypotheses  

Unlike smooth plains, the origin of inter-crater plains has yet to be well determined. Research and studies have narrowed the origin of inter-crater plains on Mercury down to two hypotheses. The first hypotheses attributes formation from fluidized impact, ejecta, which is the result of a meteorite impacting the surface so hard that it turns to liquid, then liquid debris is ejected into the air and lands, filling in any lower elevation areas or craters. The other hypothesis is that the plains formed from volcanic deposits originating from below the surface of Mercury itself.

On the basis of the distribution of inter-crater plains and stratigraphic relationships between secondary craters and smooth plains it is argued that the majority of the inter-crater plains were emplaced volcanically.

MESSENGER data 
Information and data were gathered from Mariner 10 stereoscopic images and higher resolution MESSENGER datasets. The higher resolution of the MESSENGER datasets compared with those of Mariner 10 enables the most ancient plains units on Mercury to be better characterized. The inter-crater plains units are densely cratered at diameters under ten km, producing a highly textured surface that yields ancient pre-Tolstojan and Tolstojan ages over 3.9 Ga (billion years). There is no clear correlation with topography; inter-crater plains cover high-standing plateaus and continue into topographic depressions. These results show that either the formation process must have been able to take place over a range of several kilometers supporting an impact-related origin, or that plains are generally flat lying areas which become uplifted, lowered, or tilted after formation.

References

Mercury (planet)